Río San Juan is a municipality in the María Trinidad Sánchez province of the Dominican Republic.

Climate

References

Sources 
 – World-Gazetteer.com

Populated places in María Trinidad Sánchez Province
Municipalities of the Dominican Republic